Wilmington Area School District is a public school district located in Lawrence County, Pennsylvania and Mercer County, Pennsylvania. The district serves the boroughs of New Wilmington and Volant plus Pulaski, Wilmington, Washington, and Plain Grove Townships in Lawrence County. Wilmington Township in Mercer County is also served. The school district features one elementary school in New Wilmington, a middle school, and Wilmington Area High School.

Wilmington's high school football team became the first in the county to win a state championship in the 2008 season. Its boys track team was also named state champion in 2008.

References

External links
 

School districts in Lawrence County, Pennsylvania